Carl Carr is an Antigua and Barbudan football player. He has played for Antigua and Barbuda national team.

References

Living people
Antigua and Barbuda footballers
Association football goalkeepers
Year of birth missing (living people)
Antigua and Barbuda international footballers